Green laver, known as aonori in Japan, sea cabbage or hutai in China, and parae in Korean, is a type of edible green seaweed, including species from the genera Monostroma and Ulva (Ulva prolifera, Ulva pertusa, Ulva intestinalis). It is commercially cultivated in some bay areas in Japan, Korea, and Taiwan, such as Ise Bay. It is rich in minerals such as calcium, magnesium, lithium, vitamins, and amino acids such as methionine. It is also called aosa (アオサ, Ulva pertusa) in some places in Japan.

Similar edible seaweeds, with indigenous names translated as "laver", are found in many other countries around the world. Porphyra umbilicalis, a red seaweed, is harvested from the coasts of Scotland, Wales and Ireland. (See laverbread.) In Hawaii, "the species Porphyra atropurpurea is considered a great delicacy, called ".

Culinary use

Japan 

It is used in its dried form for Japanese soups, tempura, and material for manufacturing dried nori and tsukudani and rice. It is also used in a powdered form, often blended with Ulva species of Ulvaceae as its production is limited.

It is used commonly for flavouring of some Japanese foods, usually by sprinkling the powder on the hot food, for its aroma:
Fried noodles (yakisoba or yakiudon)
Okonomiyaki (Japanese pancake)
Takoyaki (octopus dumpling ball)
Isobe age
Isobe mochi
Shichimi (seven-spice seasoning)
Japanese potato chips
Misoshiru

Korea 

In Korea, parae is eaten as a namul vegetable. It is also used to make gim (dried laver sheets).

See also
Nori
Gamet

References

External links 

Seaweeds used as human food
Mystery Seaweed and Aonori

Korean cuisine
Japanese cuisine
Edible seaweeds